Cranch is a surname. Notable people with the surname include:

 Christopher Pearse Cranch (1813–1892), American writer and artist
 John Cranch (naturalist) (1758–1816), English naturalist and explorer
 John Cranch (American painter) (1807-1891), American painter
 John Cranch (English painter) (1751–1821), English painter
 William Cranch (1769–1855), American judge

See also
Duncanson-Cranch House, listed on the National Register of Historic Places in Washington, D.C.